Malcolm Hirst (born 13 June 1945) is a British biathlete. He competed at the 1972 Winter Olympics and the 1976 Winter Olympics.

References

1945 births
Living people
British male biathletes
Olympic biathletes of Great Britain
Biathletes at the 1972 Winter Olympics
Biathletes at the 1976 Winter Olympics
Place of birth missing (living people)